Torreys Peak is a mountain in the Front Range region of the Rocky Mountains in Colorado. It is one of 53 fourteeners in Colorado. Its nearest major city is Denver.  Torreys Peak is located along the Continental Divide, as well as the division between Clear Creek County and Summit County.

Name
The first European to ascend Torreys Peak, botanist Charles C. Parry, named the peak for his botanist colleague John Torrey.  Torrey actually did not see the peak until 1872, 11 years later (the year before his death at the age 76). It is nearly always mentioned in conjunction with nearby Grays Peak.

Hiking
There are three main trails used to reach the summit.  The first is actually a continuation of Grays Peak Trail to the summit of Grays Peak, which starts in Stevens Gulch.  See the Grays Peak article for more information on accessing that trail.

A popular and challenging variation of this trail follows class-3 Kelso Ridge.

To reach Loveland Pass, follow I-70 west from Denver  to where US Route 6 breaks off and heads south. The final saddle rests at approximately 12,600 ft.

See also

List of mountain peaks of Colorado
List of Colorado fourteeners

References

External links

Torreys Peaks on 14ers.com
Torreys Peak Hiking Guide on Backpacker
Torreys Peak on ListsofJohn
Torreys Peak on Peakery
Torreys Peak on Summitpost
Grays and Torreys Peaks on TrailCentral.com
GPS Trail Map Using Google Maps

Mountains of Colorado
Mountains of Clear Creek County, Colorado
Mountains of Summit County, Colorado
Fourteeners of Colorado
North American 4000 m summits
Great Divide of North America